A queen consort is the wife of a reigning king, and usually shares her spouse's social rank and status. She holds the feminine equivalent of the king's monarchical titles and may be crowned and anointed, but historically she does not formally share the king's political and military powers, unless on occasion acting as regent.

In contrast, a queen regnant is a female monarch who rules suo jure and usually becomes queen by inheriting the throne upon the death of the previous monarch.

The title and style of a queen consort is, like that of a queen regnant, "Her Majesty the Queen". 

A queen dowager is a widowed queen consort, and a queen mother is a queen dowager who is the mother of the current monarch.

Titles

When a title other than king is held by the sovereign, his wife can be referred to by the feminine equivalent, such as princess consort or empress consort.

In monarchies where polygamy has been practised in the past (such as Morocco and Thailand), or is practised today (such as the Zulu nation and the various Yoruba polities), the number of wives of the king varies. In Morocco, King Mohammed VI has broken with tradition and given his wife, Lalla Salma, the title of princess. Prior to the reign of King Mohammed VI, the Moroccan monarchy had no such title. In Thailand, the king and queen must both be of royal descent. The king's other consorts are accorded royal titles that confer status. Other cultures maintain different traditions on queenly status. A Zulu chieftain designates one of his wives as "Great Wife", which would be the equivalent to queen consort.

Conversely, in Yorubaland, all of a chief's consorts are essentially of equal rank. Although one of their number, usually the one who has been married to the chief for the longest time, may be given a chieftaincy of her own to highlight her relatively higher status when compared to the other wives, she does not share her husband's ritual power as a chieftain. When a woman is to be vested with an authority similar to that of the chief, she is usually a lady courtier in his service who is not married to him, but who is expected to lead his female subjects on his behalf.

While the wife of a king is usually titled as the queen, there is much less consistency for the husband of a reigning queen. The title of king consort is rare. Examples are Henry Stuart, Lord Darnley, in Scotland and Francis, Duke of Cádiz, in Spain. Antoine of Bourbon-Vendôme in Navarre and Ferdinand of Saxe-Coburg-Gotha in Portugal gained the title king, not king consort, and were co-rulers with their reigning queen wives because of the practice of Jure uxoris.

The title of prince consort for the husband of a reigning queen is more common. An example is Albert of Saxe-Coburg and Gotha. He married Queen Victoria of the United Kingdom of Great Britain and Ireland; because she insisted that he be given a title identifying his status, he became Albert, Prince Consort.

Ottoman Empire

In the Ottoman Empire, Haseki sultan or sultana empress was the title held by the Lawful Wife and Imperial Consort of the Sultan.The title was first time used in the 16th century by Hurrem Sultan Lawful Wife and Empress Consort of Suleiman the Magnificent, replacing the previous title of "Baş Kadın "("Woman Major"). The Turkish pronunciation of the word Ḫāṣekī Sulṭān; .

The second position most important in the Ottoman Empire after the sultan himself and being at the same level of power and hierarchy as Valide sultan.The title was in its greatest splendor of power from its first bearer Hurrem Sultan when the marriage ceremony was given around the years 1528 and 1533 (The exact date is unknown), during this period this title was given use as Empress later it would be given use as Imperial Consort or Royal Wife during the period of use by Nurbanu Sultan and Safiye Sultan The title would lose great value and power in the 17th century with the Consorts of Ibrahim I, the only Consorts who had power in the reign of Ibrahim I were, Saliha Dilaşub Sultan and Hatice Muazzez Sultan, this title would once again have importance with Emetullah Rabia Gülnuş Sultan as Grand Imperial Consort,The Haseki Sultan would have a great significant influence on the affairs of the empire. She had great power in the court and her own rooms (always adjacent to her husband) and state staff. In particular during the 16th century, in a period known as the "Sultanate of Women", with Hurrem Sultan.

Role

The traditional historiography on queenship has created an image of a queen who is a king's "helpmate" and provider of heirs. They had power within the royal household and partially within the court. Their duty was running the royal household smoothly, such as directing the children's education, supervising the staff, and managing the private royal treasury. They unofficially acted as hostesses, ensuring the royal family was not involved in scandals and giving gifts to high-ranking officials in a society where this was important to maintain bonds. As a result, consorts were expected to act as wise, loyal, and chaste women.

Some royal consorts from foreign origins have served roles as transfers of culture. Due to their unique position of being reared in one culture and then, when very young, promised into marriage in another land with a different culture, they have served as a cultural bridge between nations. Based on their journals, diaries, and accounts, some exchanged and introduced new forms of art, music, religion, and fashion.

However, the consorts of monarchs have no official political power , even when their position is constitutionally or statutorily recognized. They often held an informal sort of power that was dependent on what opportunities were afforded to her. Should she 
have an amiable personality and high intelligence, produce a healthy heir and gain the favor of the court (especially the monarch's), then chances were higher for her to gain it over time. There have been many cases of royal consorts being shrewd or ambitious stateswomen and, usually (but not always) unofficially, being among the monarch's most trusted advisors. In some cases, the royal consort has been the chief power behind her husband's throne; e.g. Maria Luisa of Parma, wife of Charles IV of Spain. Often the consort of a deceased monarch (the dowager queen or queen mother) has served as regent if her child, the successor to the throne, was still a minor—for example:
 Queen Regent Anne of Kiev, wife of Philip I of France
 Queen Regent Jeonghui, grandmother of King Seongjong of Korea
 Queen Regent Munjeong, mother of King Myeongjong of Korea
 Queen Regent Sunwon, grandmother of King Heonjong of Korea
 Grand Princess Regent Olga of Kiev, mother of Sviatoslav I of Kiev
 Grand Princess Regent Elena Glinskaya, mother of Ivan IV of Russia
 Queen Regent Mary of Guise, mother of Mary I of Scotland
 Queen Regent Catherine of Austria, grandmother of Sebastian I of Portugal
 Queen Regent Marie de' Medici, mother of Louis XIII of France
 Queen Regent Anne, mother of Louis XIV of France
 Queen Regent Luisa de Guzmán, mother of Afonso VI of Portugal
 Rani Lakshmi Bai, mother of Raja Damodar Rao of Jhansi
 Queen Regent Maria Christina of Austria, mother of Alfonso XIII of Spain
 Queen Regent Emma of Waldeck and Pyrmont, mother of Wilhelmina I of the Netherlands
 Queen Regent Anna Khanum, mother of Abbas II of Persia
 Queen Regent Helen of Greece, mother of King Michael I of Romania

Similarly, in several cases in Siam (and later Thailand) the Queen Consort was named Regent during an extended absence of the King:
 Queen Regent Saovabha Phongsri, wife of King Chulalongkorn of Siam, served as Regent during Chulalngkorn's tour of Europe
 Queen Regent Sirikit, wife of King Bhumibol Adulyadej of Thailand, served as Regent during her husband's extended retreat

Examples of queens and empresses consort

Past queens consort:
 Queen Sindeok, consort of Taejo of Joseon
 Queen Jeongan, consort of Jeongjong of Joseon
 Queen Wongyeong, consort of Taejong of Joseon
 Queen Soheon, consort of Sejong the Great of Joseon
 Queen Jeongsun, consort of Danjong of Joseon
 Queen Inseong, consort of Injong of Joseon
 Queen Uiin, first consort of Seonjo of Joseon
 Queen Inmok, second of Seonjo of Joseon
 Queen Inyeol, first consort of Injo of Joseon
 Queen Jangnyeol, second consort of Injo of Joseon
 Queen Inseon, consort of Hyojong of Joseon
 Queen Myeongseong, consort of Hyeonjong of Joseon
 Queen Ingyeong, first consort of Sukjong of Joseon
 Queen Jang, principal consort of Sukjong of Joseon. Demoted back in 1694 to the rank of hui-bin, Royal Noble Consort Joseon rank 1
 Queen Jeongseong, first consort of Yeongjo of Joseon
 Queen Hyoui, consort of Jeongjo of Joseon
 Queen Hyohyeon, first consort Heonjong of Joseon
 Queen Maria Theresa, consort of Louis XIV of France
 Queen Marie Leszczyńska, consort of Louis XV of France
 Queen Marie Antoinette, consort of Louis XVI of France
 Queen Caroline, consort of George II
 Queen Charlotte was George III's consort for 57 years, 70 days, between 1761 and 1818, making her Britain's longest-tenured queen consort.
 Queen Caroline, consort of George IV
 Queen Adelaide, consort of William IV
 Queen Alexandra, consort of Edward VII
 Queen Mary, consort of George V
 Queen Elizabeth, consort of George VI
 Queen Nguyễn Hữu Thị Lan, consort of Bảo Đại
 Queen Victoria, consort of Gustaf V of Sweden
 Queen Louise, consort of Gustaf VI Adolf of Sweden
 Queen Louise, consort of Christian IX of Denmark
 Queen Louise, consort of Frederick VIII of Denmark
 Queen Alexandrine, consort Christian X of Denmark
 Queen Ingrid, consort of Frederick IX of Denmark
 Queen Louise, consort of Leopold I of Belgium
 Queen Marie, consort of Leopold II of Belgium
 Queen Elisabeth, consort of Albert I of Belgium
 Queen Astrid, consort of Leopold III of Belgium
 Queen Fabiola, consort of Baudouin of Belgium
 Queen Paola, consort of Albert II of Belgium
 Queen Sofía, consort of Juan Carlos I of Spain
 Queen Anne Marie, consort of Constantine II of Greece
 Queen Geraldine, consort of Zog I of Albania
 Queen Marie José, consort of Umberto II of Italy
 Queen Kapiolani, consort of King Kalākaua of Hawaii
 Queen Soraya Tarzi, principal consort of King Amanullah Khan of Afghanistan
 Tsaritsa Ioanna, consort of Tsar Boris III of Bulgaria
 Queen Elizabeth, consort of Henry VII of England
Ranee Sylvia Brett, consort of Vyner Brooke of The Raj of Sarawak 
 Queen Catherine, first consort of Henry VIII of England. She was also regent in times of war.
 Queen Anne Boleyn, second consort of Henry VIII of England.
 Queen Jane Seymour, third consort of Henry VIII of England.
 Queen Anne of Cleves, fourth consort of Henry VIII of England
 Queen Catherine Howard, fifth consort of Henry VIII of England
 Queen Catherine Parr, sixth consort of Henry VIII of England

 Queen Anne, consort of James I of England
 Queen Henrietta, consort of Charles I of England
 Queen Cattherine, consort of Charles II of England
 Queen Mary, consort of James II of England
 Queen Halaevalu Mata'aho, consort of Tāufa'āhau Tupou IV, Tu'i of Tonga.
 Queen Hortense, consort of Louis Bonaparte, King of Holland
 Queen Sultanah Bahiyah, consort of Abdul Halim of Kedah, the fifth of Yang di-Pertuan Agong of Malaysia
 Queen Sultanah Haminah, consort of Abdul Halim of Kedah, the 14th of Yang di-Pertuan Agong of Malaysia
 Queen Siti Aishah, consort of Salahuddin of Selangor, the 11th of Yang di-Pertuan Agong of Malaysia
 Queen Tunku Ampuan Najihah, consort of Ja'afar of Negeri Sembilan, the tenth of Yang di-Pertuan Agong of Malaysia
 Queen Raja Permaisuri Tuanku Bainun, consort of Azlan Shah of Perak, the 9th of Yang di-Pertuan Agong of Malaysia
 Queen Tunku Puan Zanariah, consort of Iskandar of Johor, the 8th of Yang di-Pertuan Agong of Malaysia
 Queen Sisowath Kossamak, consort of King Norodom Suramarit of Cambodia
 Queen Norodom Monineath, consort of King Norodom Sihanouk of Cambodia
 Queen Wilhelmine, consort of William I of the Netherlands
 Queen Anna Pavlovna, consort of William II of the Netherlands
 Queen Sophie, first consort of William III of the Netherlands
 Queen Emma, second consort of William III of the Netherlands: When William died on 23 November 1890, Emma became regent (1890–1898) for her underaged daughter, Wilhelmina, the late king's only surviving child.
 Queen Maud, consort of King Haakon VII of Norway. She was also simultaneously a princess of the United Kingdom.
 Queen Ratna, second consort of Mahendra of Nepal
 Queen Rambai Barni, consort of King Prajadhipok of Thailand
 Queen Ruth, consort (or Mohumagadi) of Seretse Khama, King of the Bamangwato Tswanas of Botswana
 Queen Mantfombi, principal consort (or Inkosikazi Enkhulu) of Goodwill Zwelithini of Zululand, South Africa. She was also simultaneously a princess of Eswatini.

Past empresses consort:
 Empress Theodora, consort of Justinian I, East Roman Emperor
 Empress Aelia Sophia, consort of Justin II of the Byzantine Empire
 Empress Xiaocigao, principal consort of Hongwu Emperor from the Ming dynasty
 Empress Mariam-uz-Zamani, principal consort of Akbar the Great, the third Mughal Emperor
 Empress Taj Bibi Bilqis Makani, principal consort of Jahangir, the fourth Mughal Emperor
 Empress Nur Jahan, chief consort of  Jahangir, the fourth Mughal Emperor
 Empress Mumtaz Mahal, principal consort of Shah Jahan, the fifth Mughal Emperor
 Empress Isabella of Portugal, consort of Charles V, Holy Roman Emperor. She was the regent of the Spanish Empire. 
 Haseki Sultan Hürrem Sultan, principal consort and legal wife of Suleiman the Magnificent, Sultan of the Ottoman Empire.
 Haseki Sultan Nurbanu Sultan, principal consort and legal wife of Selim II, Sultan of the Ottoman Empire.

 Haseki Sultan Safiye Sultan, principal consort of Murad III, Sultan of the Ottoman Empire.

 Haseki Sultan Kösem Sultan, principal consort and legal wife of Ahmed I, Sultan of the Ottoman Empire. She served as regent during the minority for her son Murad IV and her grandson Mehmed IV between 1623 - 1632 and again from 1649 until 1651.
 Empress Maria Theresa of Austria, consort of Francis I, Holy Roman Empire.
 Empress Ana María Huarte, consort of Agustín I of Mexico, Emperor of Mexico.
 Titular Empress Carlota Joaquina of Spain, consort of John VI of Portugal, Titular Emperor of Brazil
 Empress Carlota of Mexico, consort of Maximilian I of Mexico, Emperor of Mexico.
 Empress Maria Leopoldina, consort of Pedro I, Emperor of Brazil
 Empress Amélie, consort of Pedro I, Emperor of Brazil
 Empress Teresa Cristina, consort of Pedro II, Emperor of Brazil
 Empress Myeongseong, first principal wife of Gojong, the first emperor of the Korean Empire
 Empress Eugénie, consort of Napoléon III, Emperor of the French
 Empress Augusta Victoria, consort of Wilhelm II
 Empress Elisabeth, consort of Franz Joseph I
 Empress Xiao Zhen Xian, principal consort of Xianfeng, Qing Emperor
 Empress Alexandra Feodorovna, consort of Nicholas II, Emperor and Autocrat of All Russia
 Empress Durdhara, principal consort of Chandragupta Maurya, first Mauryan emperor
 Empress Shubhadrangi, principal consort of Bindusara, Mauryan emperor
 Empress Asandhimitra, principal consort (or Agramahishi'') of Ashoka, third Mauryan emperor
 Empress Devi, first principal consort of Ashoka, third Mauryan emperor
 Empress Karuvaki, principal consort of Ashoka, third Mauryan emperor
 Empress Padmavati, principal consort of Ashoka, third Mauryan emperor
 Empress Tishyaraksha, principal consort of Ashoka, third Mauryan emperor
 Empress Michiko, consort of Emperor Akihito of JapanCurrent queens consort:
 Queen Camilla, consort of Charles III of the United Kingdom
 Queen Azizah, consort of Abdullah of Malaysia
 Queen Nanasipauʻu Tukuʻaho, consort of Tupou VI of Tonga
 Queen 'Masenate, consort of Letsie III of Lesotho
 Queen Jetsun Pema, consort of Jigme Khesar Namgyal Wangchuck of Bhutan
 Queen Saleha, consort of Hassanal Bolkiah of Brunei Darussalam 
 Queen Máxima, consort of Willem-Alexander of the Netherlands
 Queen Mathilde, consort of Philippe of Belgium
 Queen Rania, consort of Abdullah II of Jordan
 Queen Silvia, consort of Carl XVI Gustaf of Sweden
 Queen Suthida, consort of Vajiralongkorn of Thailand
 Queen Letizia, consort of Felipe VI of Spain
 Queen Sonja, consort of Harald V of NorwayCurrent empress consort:
 Empress Masako, consort of Emperor Naruhito of JapanCurrent queens consort in federal monarchies'''
 Queen Nur Zahirah, consort of Mizan Zainal Abidin of Terengganu
 Queen Fauziah, consort of Sirajuddin of Perlis
 Queen Norashikin, consort of Sharafuddin of Selangor
 Queen Aishah Rohani, consort of Muhriz of Negeri Sembilan
 Queen Zarith Sofiah, consort of Ibrahim Ismail of Johor
 Queen Nur Diana Petra, consort of Muhammad V of Kelantan
 Queen Zara Salim, consort of Nazrin Shah of Perak
 Queen Maliha, consort of Sallehuddin of Kedah
 Queen Azizah, consort of Abdullah of Pahang 
 Queen Ratu Hemas, consort of Hamengkubuwono X of Yogyakarta

Because queens consort lack an ordinal with which to distinguish between them, many historical texts and encyclopedias refer to deceased consorts by their premarital (or maiden) name or title, not by their marital royal title (examples: Queen Mary, consort of George V, is usually called Mary of Teck, and Queen Maria José, consort of Umberto II of Italy, is usually called Marie José of Belgium).

See also

 First Lady
 Consort crown
 Prince consort
 Princess consort
 Haseki Sultan
 Sultana
 Royal Noble Consort (Korea)
 List of Bohemian consorts
 List of Burmese consorts
 List of British royal consorts
 List of Bulgarian consorts
 List of royal consorts of Canada
 List of Danish royal consorts
 List of Dutch royal consorts
 List of Queens and Empresses of France
 List of Georgian consorts
 List of Hawaiian royal consorts
 List of Hungarian consorts
 List of Japanese imperial consorts
 List of Norwegian royal consorts
 List of Persian consorts
 List of Pre-colonial Filipino Consorts
 List of Portuguese queens
 List of Spanish royal consorts
 List of Swedish royal consorts
 List of Thai royal consorts
 List of Tongan royal consorts

References

 Consort
Royal titles
-